Maximum Security is the second studio album by guitarist Tony MacAlpine, released in 1987 through PolyGram. It is his only release to enter the U.S. Billboard 200, reaching No. 146 and remaining on that chart for eleven weeks.

Critical reception

Andy Hinds at AllMusic gave Maximum Security 4.5 stars out of 5, calling it "much better" than MacAlpine's 1986 debut album Edge of Insanity, and "essential listening for anyone interested in instrumental guitar music"; its "captivating neoclassical/fusion forays are filled with plenty of beautiful melodies and hair-raising solos".

Track listing

Personnel
Tony MacAlpine – guitar, keyboard, bass
George Lynch – additional guitar solos (tracks 3, 9)
Jeff Watson – additional guitar solos (track 6)
Mike Mani – keyboard programming
Deen Castronovo – drums (tracks 1–3, 5, 6)
Atma Anur – drums (tracks 4, 7, 9–11)
Steve Fontano – engineering
Dino Alden – engineering assistance
George Horn – mastering
Mike Varney – production

Chart performance

References

External links
In Review: Tony MacAlpine "Maximum Security" at Guitar Nine Records

Tony MacAlpine albums
1987 albums
Shrapnel Records albums
Albums produced by Mike Varney